Houshmand Almasi (30 March 1928 – 17 December 2016) was an Iranian fencer. He competed in the individual and team foil, épée and sabre events at the 1964 Summer Olympics.

Colonel Almasi, president of the Iranian Fencing Federation, submitted the proposed Constitution of Asian Fencing Confederation to the FIE Congress which was held during the 1972 Munich Olympic Games in Germany. Subsequently, he became the first president of AFC.

References

External links
 

1928 births
2016 deaths
Iranian male épée fencers
Olympic fencers of Iran
Fencers at the 1964 Summer Olympics
Iranian male foil fencers
Iranian male sabre fencers
20th-century Iranian people